North Beach, historically known as Rincon Point, is a section of Corpus Christi, Texas located on the far north end of the city. It is on the El Rincon peninsula surrounded by Corpus Christi Bay and Nueces Bay.  The name was changed to Corpus Christi Beach in the 1950s, but the City Council officially changed the name back to "North Beach" in 2012, because most people still called it "North Beach" and many local business owners and residents requested the change. The city then erected a $750,000 giant archway with "North Beach" written on it in 2012 at the gateway to this tourist area.

Attractions
Along with the beach, the Texas State Aquarium and the USS Lexington are located here. The Corpus Christi Beachwalk, a 10-foot-wide sidewalk that runs parallel to the entire length of the 1.5-mile-long beach, was completed in 2012.

See also
Corpus Christi

External links
Handbook of Texas Online

Geography of Corpus Christi, Texas

http://www.caller.com/news/local/north-beach-ferris-wheel-points-to-glory-days-ep-833039943.html